Steve Huison (born 2 December 1962) is a British actor who is mostly seen on television and occasionally in films. He is best known for his roles as “Lomper” in the film The Full Monty (1997) and Eddie Windass in Coronation Street.

Personal life
Huison was born in Leeds, West Riding of Yorkshire. He trained at the Rose Bruford College in Sidcup, London. As of 2016, he was in living in Robin Hood's Bay with his wife, Theresa.

Career

Acting
In film, Huison is best known for his role as Lomper in The Full Monty (1997). He also appeared in The Navigators (2001) directed by Ken Loach. On television, he has played character roles in numerous television series including Casualty, Where the Heart Is, Dinnerladies, Heartbeat, The Royle Family, Scott & Bailey, and the post-apocalyptic ITV drama aerial, The Last Train (1999, also known as Cruel Earth).

In 2008, Huison took the role of porter Norman Dunstan in the daily ITV1 hospital drama, The Royal Today, a spin-off from the Sunday night drama, The Royal. From 2008 to 2011, Huison played Eddie Windass in Coronation Street. He briefly starred as Mr. Byron in the first season of the CBBC series, 4 O'Clock Club, which began airing in 2012. His role was taken over by Simon Lowe for season 2 in 2013.

Theatre Company
He is also a co-founder of the Shoestring Theatre Company.

References

External links

1962 births
English male television actors
Male actors from Leeds
Male actors from Yorkshire
Living people
Outstanding Performance by a Cast in a Motion Picture Screen Actors Guild Award winners